The cryptic treehunter (Cichlocolaptes mazarbarnetti) is an extinct species of bird in the family Furnariidae. It was endemic to Brazil.

Description
The species was described from a specimen that formerly had been identified as an Alagoas foliage-gleaner. Its taxonomic status is still controversial.

Distribution and habitat
The species has only been recorded from two sites with humid forest habitat in northeast Brazil, Murici in Alagoas and Frei Caneca in Pernambuco.

Conservation
Although formally described in 2014, the cryptic treehunter was last seen in the wild in 2007. The species was provisionally classified by the IUCN as Critically Endangered in 2018, but may already be extinct. A 2018 study citing bird extinction patterns and the lack of any confirmed sightings since 2007 but suggests it went extinct earlier. In 2019, the IUCN classified this bird as extinct.

References

Furnariidae
Birds of the Atlantic Forest
Endemic birds of Brazil
Birds described in 2014